A conjugal family is a nuclear family that may consist of a married couple and their children (by birth or adoption). Conjugal means there is a marriage relationship. The family relationship is principally focused inward and ties to extended kin are voluntary and based on emotional bonds, rather than strict duties and obligations. The spouses and their children are considered to be of prime importance, and other more distant relatives less important. The marriage bond is important and stressed.

Since the notion of "family" has changed over time (for example, increasing acceptance of LGBT parenting, stepfamily, and adoption), the meaning of the term "nuclear family" became muddled (some use it to refer exclusively to opposite-sex parents, while others do not). To combat the ambiguity, the term "conjugal family" was created.

In Western societies 
There are basic characteristics to a conjugal family. In most western societies, people are free to choose their spouse themselves, rather than their spouse being selected for them by arranged marriage. In western societies, the majority of (but not all) pairings are opposite-sex.

Western societies often treat marriage as a legally-binding relationship, rather than an informal agreement. In these societies, both partners usually share control of their children's upbringing. They both have roles as a parent to protect their children, oversee the development of their children in society, and see to the survival of their children.

In some cases, both partners have separate lines of income to support the family; in others, only one receives substantial income (colloquially called the "breadwinner") while the other spends more time caring for the family directly (looking after the children, taking care of the home, etc.).

Conjugal family roles have changed over the course of history. Historically, marriages were exclusively opposite-sex and it was assumed that the male would be the head of the household and provide for the family while the woman would stay in the home and care for the children. However, conjugal roles have evolved over the years; in modern times, same-sex couples are more accepted, and in opposite-sex couples, the husband and wife are treated equally.

See also
Arranged marriage
Alliance theory
Types of marriages

References

 * 
 Durkheim, Emile. "The conjugal family." Emile Durkheim on institutional analysis (1978): 229-239.
 

Family
Marriage, unions and partnerships